This is a discography of Polygon Records.

10" 78rpm singles

	P. 1001	Louis Prima and his Orchestra with Keely Smith	Oh Babe! / Piccolina Lena	Dec-50
	P. 1002	Petula Clark with the Stargazers and the Harold Smart Quintet You Are My True Love / You're The Sweetest In The Land	Dec-50
	P. 1003	Petula Clark	Beloved Be Faithful / Fly Away Peter, Fly Away Paul	Feb-51
	P. 1004	Petula Clark	Tennessee Waltz / Sleepy Eyes	Feb-51
	P. 1005	Petula Clark	Teasin' / Black Note Serenade	Apr-51
	P. 1006	Jimmy Young	Life's Desire / Don't Worry 'Bout Me	Apr-51
	P. 1007	Ray Martin and his Concert Orchestra	Muriella / Gipsy Fiddler	Jun-51
	P. 1008	Petula Clark May Kway / Clickety Clack	Jun-51
	P. 1009	Petula Clark and Jimmy Young	Mariandl / Broken Heart	Jun-51
	P. 1010	Jimmy Young	Would I Love You / West Wind	Jun-51
	P. 1011	Jimmy Young (* with Barbara Anne)	Land Of Make-Believe* / Park On A Sunday	Jun-51
	P. 1012	The Frank Baron Trio	Moontide / Rotten Row	Oct-51
	P. 1013	Jimmy Young	Too Young / How Can I Leave You	Aug-51
	P. 1014	Jan Rosol	La Ronde De L'Amour (Love's Roundabout) / Melancolie	Aug-51
	P. 1015	Hamish Menzies with his Rhythm	I'm Just A Coconut Collector / Look Out!	Sep-51
	P. 1016	Hamish Menzies with his Rhythm	I Wanna Hear It From You / Too Many Love Songs	Sep-51
	P. 1017	Jimmy Young	Vanity / Only Fools	Oct-51
	P. 1018	Jimmy Young	Because Of You / So Many Times Have I Cried Over You	Oct-51
	P. 1019	Hamish Menzies with his Rhythm	Phantom Pianist / Piccadilly Piper	Nov-51
	P. 1020	Hamish Menzies with his Rhythm	By Kind Permission Of Love / Alibis	Dec-51
	P. 1021	Petula Clark	Cold Cold Heart / That's How A Love Song Is Born	Nov-51
	P. 1022	Petula Clark	Tell Me Truly / Song Of The Mermaid	Nov-51
	P. 1023	Frank Chacksfield and his Orchestra and Chorus	Sleigh Ride For Two / Kate-Chen	Nov-51
	P. 1024	Jimmy Young	Green Glens Of Antrim / And So to Sleep Again	Nov-51
	P. 1025	Jimmy Young	I'll Sing to You / My Love and Devotion	Dec-51
	P. 1026	Luckie Robinson	Unforgettable / No Man Is An Island	Dec-51
	P. 1027	Frank Chacksfield and his Orchestra	Prelude To A Memory / Flirtation Waltz (Valse Coquette)	Dec-51
	P. 1028	Max Wall	Me And My Tune / Take It Easy	Dec-51
	P. 1029	La Chanson De Lausanne (The Swiss Choir Of Lausanne)	Magali / Chanson A Danser	Jan-52
	P. 1030	La Chanson De Lausanne (The Swiss Choir Of Lausanne)	Aux Marches Du Palais / La Jardinière Du Roy	Jan-52
	P. 1031	Robin Richmond	That Ever-Lovin' Rag / What A Difference A Day Made	Jan-52
	P. 1032	Jimmy Young	Sin / It's All In The Game	Jan-52
	P. 1033	Jimmy Young	Cry / Time Alone Will Tell	Jan-52
	P. 1034	Evelyne Dorat	L'Ames des Poetes (At Last, At Last) / En Buvant Le Vin Doux	Jan-52
	P. 1035	Jimmy Young	The Little White Cloud That Cried / Turn Back The Hands Of Time	Feb-52
	P. 1036	Gwen Liddel	It's All Over The Memories / Mistakes	Feb-52
	P. 1037	The Mouth Organ Swingers	Hohner Boogie / Mouth Organ Boogie	Mar-52
	P. 1038	Sue Carson with the Harold Smart Trio	Honey, You Can't Love Two / The Nickelodeon Rag	Feb-52
	P. 1039	Jimmy Young	We Won't Live In A Castle / Roulette	Mar-52
	P. 1040	Ray Martin and his Concert Orchestra	At Last! At Last! / Dancing Bells	Apr-52
	P. 1041	Jimmy Young	Kiss Of Fire / Faith	May-52
	P. 1042	Jimmy Young	Be Anything (But Be Mine) / Love, Where Are You Now	May-52
	P. 1043	Petula Clark	The Card / It Had To Be You	May-52
	P. 1044	Annette Klooger	Baby You're Wrong / So Madly In Love	Sep-52
	P. 1045	Dennis Lotis	Here In My Heart / Take My Heart	Sep-52
	P. 1046	Slim and the Boys	Meet Mister Callaghan / Blarney	Sep-52
	P. 1047	Jimmy Young	Forgive And Forget / I Thought Of You Last Night	Sep-52
	P. 1048	Petula Clark	A Boy In Love / Fly Away Peter, Fly Away Paul	Oct-52
	P. 1049	Annette Klooger	Botch-a-Me (Ba-Ba-Baciami Piccina) / Start Singing A Song	Sep-52
	P. 1050	The Browne Brothers	Lonely Hearts / Farewell Merry Friends	Oct-52
	P. 1051	Monty Norman with Frank Chacksfield and his Orchestra	Melody / You Belong To Me	Oct-52
	P. 1052	Jimmy Young	Mademoiselle / My Shining Hour	Nov-52
	P. 1053	Monty Norman with Frank Chacksfield and his Orchestra	Takes Two To Tango / The Valley Of The Roses	Nov-52
	P. 1054	Lew Bart with Joseph Kun's Music	Two-Faced Clock / I'll Never Know	Nov-52
	P. 1055	Smokey Knight	I Can't Believe That You're Gone / Too Many Cigarettes	Nov-52
	P. 1056	Petula Clark	Where Did My Snowman Go? / Anytime Is Teatime Now	Dec-52
	P. 1057	Petula Clark	Made In Heaven / Temptation Rag	Jan-53
	P. 1058	Bernie Lewis	Blarney / Molly McCarthy And Mary Malone	Jan-53
	P. 1059	Robin Richmond	Ecstacy / Young And Healthy	Jan-53
	P. 1060	Dolores Ventura	Hai-Hai-Hai / Llamada	Jan-53
	P. 1061	Ron Goodwin and his Orchestra	Heykens' Serenade No.1 / Wedding Of The Rose	Jan-53
	P. 1062	Reggie Goff	Moon Above Malaya / Just A Souvenir	Jan-53
	P. 1063	Petula Clark	My Love Is A Wanderer / Take Care Of Yourself	Jan-53
	P. 1064	Derrick Francis	Just Remember Me / I'd Love To Fall Asleep And Wake Up In Your Arms	Mar-53
	P. 1065	Robin Richmond	Buffoon / That Naughty Waltz	Mar-53
	P. 1066	Ron Goodwin	Rainbow Run / Jolly Brothers	Mar-53
	P. 1067	Dolores Ventura	Rag Of Rags / Calico Rag	Apr-53
	P. 1068	Dorothy Squires	I'm Walking Behind You / Is There Any Room In Your Heart	Apr-53
	P. 1069	Monty Norman and the Coronets	Cuban Love Song / Sleepless Nights	May-53
	P. 1070	The Harmonics	Let's All Be Good Elizabethans / You've Done Something To My Heart	May-53
	P. 1071	Eric Winstone and his Orchestra	Frustration / Anticipation	May-53
	P. 1072	Petula Clark	Christopher Robin At Buckingham Palace / Three Little Kittens	Jun-53
	P. 1073	Jan Rosol Ni Toi, Ni Moi / Down The Road To Monterey	Jul-53
	P. 1074	Reggie Goff	The Bridge Of Sighs / I'll Always Love You	Jul-53
	P. 1075	Mike McKenzie	The Kissing Tree / Yours For The Asking	Sep-53
	P. 1076	Dorothy Squires	From Your Lips To The Ears Of God / Sorrento And You	Sep-53
	P. 1077	Dorothy Squires	If You Love Me / Things Go Wrong	Nov-53
	P. 1078	Dolores Ventura	Piano Tuners Rag / Fluter's Samba	Oct-53
	P. 1079	Dorothy Squires	It's The Talk Of The Town / Lost And Found	Oct-53
	P. 1080	The Wondertones	Mystery Street / No Escape	Nov-53
	P. 1081	Radio Revellers	Breaker Of Hearts / Don't Ever Say	Nov-53
	P. 1082	Petula Clark	Poppa Piccolino / The Who-Is-It Song	Nov-53
	P. 1083	Pierre Dorsey and Orchestra	Carnavalito / The Girl From London	Nov-53
	P. 1084	Eric Winstone and his Orchestra / Laurie Johnson and his Orchestra	Cat Walk / Slow Train Blues	Nov-53
	P. 1085	Jimmy Young	Peace Of Mind / West Wind	Nov-53
	P. 1086	The Oscar Rabin Band with Mel Gaynor	Crazy Man Crazy / Forgive Me	Nov-53
	P. 1087	Reggie Goff	Answer Me / Rags To Riches	Nov-53
	P. 1088	Eva Bartok	Kiss Me / Don't Touch Me	Nov-53
	P. 1089	Primo Scala and his Accordion Band	Swedish Rhapsody - Answer Me - Rags to Riches / I Saw Mommy Kissing Santa Claus - When You Hear Big Ben - Poppa Piccolino	Nov-53
	P. 1090	Radio Revellers	Istanbul (Not Constantinople) / If You've Never Been In Love	Dec-53
	P. 1091	Robin Richmond	The Creep / Park Plaza	Dec-53
	P. 1092	Radio Revellers	Oh! My Pa-Pa / Don't Ever Leave Me	Jan-54
	P. 1093	Robin Richmond	The Velvet Glove / Windmill Waltz	Jan-54
	P. 1094	Eric Winstone and his Orchestra	Cobblers Song / Robbers March	Jan-54
	P. 1095	Lou Preager and his Orchestra	Madonna / The Door, Senor	Jan-54
	P. 1096	Dorothy Squires	Romany Violin / Changing Partners	Feb-54
	P. 1097	Malcom Lockyer and his Orchestra	Pizzicato Rag / Fiddler's Boogie	Feb-54
	P. 1098	Colin Prince	You're On Trial / Angelina	Feb-54
	P. 1099	Michael Fredericks and his Orchestra	Ditto / Petite Ballerina	Feb-54
	P. 1100	Primo Scala and his Accordion Band	Oh My Pa-Pa - Changing Partners - You, You, You / The Velvet Glove - If You Love Me - Golden Tango	Feb-54
	P. 1101	Primo Scala and his Accordion Band	Music Box Tango / Lazy Whistler	Feb-54
	P. 1102	Geoff Love and his Orchestra	Desire / Episode	Feb-54
	P. 1103	Johnny Brandon with the Phantoms	Dreamer's Highway / Heartless	Mar-54
	P. 1104	Roy Edwards	From The Vine Came The Grape / I Need	Mar-54
	P. 1105	The Winter Trio	"Front Page Story" Theme / So Lonely	Mar-54
	P. 1106	Lou Preager and his Orchestra (The Ragpickers)	I See The Moon / Pi-Anna Rag	Mar-54
	P. 1107	Radio Revellers	Bell Bottom Blues / An Armful Of Love	Mar-54
	P. 1108	Lou Preager and his Orchestra (*with Paul Rich)	Egon Tango / I'll Follow You*	Mar-54
	P. 1109	Reggie Goff with the Velvetones and his Sextet	Marry Her While You're Young / Love Me	Mar-54
	P. 1110	Bob Carroll	There Is Danger / Be True To Me	Apr-54
	P. 1111	Johnny Brandon	Sing Me Something Soft And Sentimental / Merci Beaucoup	May-54
	P. 1112	The Trio (Max Jaffa, Jack Byfield and Reginald Kilbey)	Dance Of The Angels / Moon Through The Trees	Apr-54
	P. 1113	Clark Dennis	Granada / My Love For You	Apr-54
	P. 1114	Anthony Steel and the Radio Revellers	West Of Zanzibar (Jambo) / Who Cares	Apr-54
	P. 1115	Joe Kerr and his Jokers	Mutiny On The Bounty / Bread And Water	Apr-54
	P. 1116	Joe "Mr Piano" Henderson	Sour Tinkle / Bye Bye Blues	Apr-54
	P. 1117	Petula Clark	The Little Shoemaker / Helpless	Apr-54
	P. 1118	The Mulcays	My Happiness / Near You	Jun-54
	P. 1119	Marco Polo	Have A Heart / Disappointed	Jun-54
	P. 1120	The Melody Three with Primo Scala and his Band	Canoodlin' Rag / The Man With The Banjo	Jun-54
	P. 1121	Petula Clark	Meet Me In Battersea Park / A Long Way To Go	Jun-54
	P. 1122	Radio Revellers	Monkeys Of Gibraltar / Roll Me Home	Jul-54
	P. 1123	Genie Conrad	Joey / Everyone Is Saying	Jul-54
	P. 1124	Elly Williams	Ah-Dee-Dong / Worry, Worry, Worry	Jul-54
	P. 1125	Robin Richmond	Valse Grise (The Grey Waltz) / Hysterics Rag	Jul-54
	P. 1126	Jan Rosol	The Story Of Tina / Chez Moi	Jul-54
	P. 1127	Inia Te Wiata	Christening Chant / Choral Dance	Jul-54
	P. 1128	Petula Clark	Smile / Somebody	Jul-54
	P. 1129	Joe "Mr Piano" Henderson	Smile / Jangle-Box Rag	Jul-54
	P. 1130	Bill O'Connor	To Be Your Love / The Words That I Whisper	Sep-54
	P. 1131	Johnny Brandon with the Phantoms	Tomorrow / High As A Mountain	Sep-54
	P. 1132	Betty Garrett	Go / (I Gotta Do) Soft Shoe	Sep-54
	P. 1133	Jerry Wallace	Dixieanna / Runnin' After Love	Sep-54
	P. 1134	Danny Capri	You're So Simpatico / Mama Nicolini	Sep-54
	P. 1135	Petula Clark	Christmas Cards / Little Johnny Rainbow	Oct-54
	P. 1136	Jan Rosol (*and Gwen Campbell)	I Love Paris* / C'est Magnifique	Oct-54
	P. 1137	Laurie Johnson	Hallelujah / Many Dreams Ago	Oct-54
	P. 1138	Janet Gordon / Billy Reid and his Orchestra	Cross Of Gold / Peppito	Oct-54
	P. 1139	Bernard Monshin and his Concert Orchestra	Blue Sapphire / Tinkle-Box Samba	Oct-54
	P. 1140	Roy Edwards	Midnight / Romeo And Juliet Waltz	Nov-54
	P. 1141	Radio Revellers with Dr. Barnardo's Children	There'll Always Be A Christmas / Mrs. Santa Claus	Nov-54
	P. 1142	Johnny Brandon	2-4-6-8 / Warning	Nov-54
	P. 1143	Laurie Johnson and his Orchestra	Pick Yourself Up / Frenchman's Creek	Nov-54
	P. 1144	Chris Dane	Love You Didn't Do Right By Me / Stella By Starlight	Nov-54
	P. 1145	Bernard Monshin and his Concert Orchestra	Tango Bolero / The Last Tango	Jan-55
	P. 1146	Petula Clark	Majorca / Fascinating Rhythm	Jan-55
	P. 1147	Monty Kelly and his Orchestra	Majorca / Neapolitan Nights	Jan-55
	P. 1148	Chris Dane	Love Me Now / A Love Like Ours	Jan-55
	P. 1149	Dorothy Squires and the Radio Revellers	White Wings / With All My Heart	Jan-55
	P. 1150	The Harry Arnold Orchestra	Desiree / Blue Mirage	Jan-55
	P. 1151	Johnny O'Connor	A Blossom Fell / Give Me The Right	Jan-55
	P. 1152	Don Carlos and his Orchestra	The Hotchy-Witchy / Three Cuban Mice	Feb-55
	P. 1153	Eric Winstone and his Orchestra	Fanfare Boogie / Slow Joe	Feb-55
	P. 1154	Anthony Steel and the Radio Revellers / The Radio Revellers	The Flame / Under The Southern Cross	Feb-55
	P. 1155	Bethe Douglas	Take It From Me / I'm So Right Tonight	Feb-55
	P. 1156	Billy McCormack	I Went To My Mother / Unsuspecting Heart	Mar-55
	P. 1157	Joe "Mr Piano" Henderson / Laurie Johnson and his Orchestra	First Theme / Out Of The Clouds	Mar-55
	P. 1158	Tony Osborne and his Orchestra with Gerry Gray and Gwen Campbell	Stranger in Paradise / Baubles, Bangles and Beads	Apr-55
	P. 1159	Kenny Baker (flugelhorn) with Laurie Johnson and his Orchestra	Mama / Love Is Here To Stay	Apr-55
	P. 1160	Harriot and Evans	Keep Laughing In The Sunshine / Jamaica	Mar-55
	P. 1161	The Dinning Sisters	Goofus / Mama (He Treats Your Daughter Mean)	Apr-55
	P. 1162	Dorothy Squires and the Radio Revellers	When I Grow Too Old To Dream / Blue, Blue, Blue	Apr-55
	P. 1163	Johnny Brandon	Don't Worry / Strike It Lucky	May-55
	P. 1164	Petula Clark	Romance In Rome / Chee Chee Oo Chee	May-55
	P. 1165	Radio Revellers	Boomerang / My Helpless Heart	May-55
	P. 1166	Laurie Johnson and his Orchestra (*Phil Seamen on drums)	Drum Crazy* / Jamboree	May-55
	P. 1167	Joe "Mr Piano" Henderson	Sing It With Joe - Parts 1 And 2	May-55
	P. 1168	Kathie Kay with Laurie Johnson and his Orchestra	All My Life / I'll Be There	May-55
	P. 1169	Petula Clark (* with Joe "Mr Piano" Henderson)	Crazy Otto Rag* / The Pendulum Song	Jun-55
	P. 1170	Jackie Bond (sax) and his Orchestra	Evermore / Goodnight Waltz	Jun-55
	P. 1171	The Johnny Gregory Orchestra	The Watermill / Elaine	Jun-55
	P. 1172	Robin Richmond at the Hammond Organ	Theme From The Film "Time Of His Life" / Crinoline Waltz	Jun-55
	P. 1173	Eric Winstone and his Orchestra	Opus One Mambo / Rhythm And Blues	Jun-55
	P. 1174	Johnny Brandon	Anyone Can Be A Millionaire / Love And Kisses	Jul-55
	P. 1175	Eric Winstone and his Orchestra (*Stan Roderick on trumpet)	Heartbreak* / Deep Sleep	Jul-55
	P. 1176	Billy McCormack with Laurie Johnson and his Orchestra	For As Long As I Live / Stars Shine In Your Eyes	Jul-55
	P. 1177	Don Carlos and his Orchestra (*Al Winnet on trumpet)	Why Do I (Theme From "Am I A Camera"*) / Now Or Never	Aug-55
	P. 1178	Laurie Johnson and his Orchestra	Song Of The Pearlfishers / Letter To Virginia	Aug-55
	P. 1179	Petula Clark	How Are Things With You / Tuna Puna Trinidad	Aug-55
	P. 1180	Julian Patrick with Don Costa and his Orchestra	Give A Fool A Chance / A Woman's Love Is Never Done	Aug-55
	P. 1181	UNISSUED
	P. 1182	Jackie Bond (sax) and his Orchestra	Today And Every Day / The Bridge Of Love	Aug-55
	P. 1183	Tom Stribling with the Johnny Gregory Orchestra	Until You're Mine / Walk With Me Forever	Aug-55
	P. 1184	Joe "Mr Piano" Henderson and his Friends	Sing It Again With Joe - Parts 1 And 2	Aug-55
	P. 1185	Lois Winter	The Breeze And I / Malaguena	Sep-55
	P. 1186	Diane Cilento / Laurie Johnson and his Orchestra	A Fool And His Heart / The "Lily Watkins" Tune	Sep-55
	P. 1187	Johnny Brandon with the Norman Warren Orchestra and Chorus	Home / I'm Burning My Bridges Behind Me	Oct-55
	P. 1188	Mae Williams with Orchestra conducted by Van Alexander	I Went To The Village / Break Through	Oct-55
	P. 1189	The Johnny Gregory Orchestra	Tango Capriccioso / The Forget-Me-Not Waltz	UNISSUED
	P. 1190	Robin Richmond at the Hammond Organ	Organ-ising The Blues / Some Like It Hot	Oct-55

See also
 Polygon Records
 Alan A. Freeman

References

Discographies of British record labels

External links
 45worlds Discography with label scans